Mattawa Water Aerodrome  is located adjacent to Mattawa, Ontario, Canada.

See also
 Mattawa Airport

References

Registered aerodromes in Ontario
Airports in Nipissing District
Mattawa, Ontario
Seaplane bases in Ontario